Coleophora tshiligella is a moth of the family Coleophoridae. It is found in southern Russia.

References

tshiligella
Moths of Europe
Moths described in 1976